Engulfment and cell motility protein 1 is a protein that in humans is encoded by the ELMO1 gene. ELMO1 is located on chromosome number seven in humans and is located on chromosome number thirteen in mice.

Structure 

The human engulfment and cell motility protein 1, ELMO1, is 720 residues in length.  The protein contains the following three domains:

 N-terminal Armadillo domain (residues 82-262)
 central ELMO (Engulfment and Cell Motility) domain (301-492)
 C-terminal pleckstrin homology domain (residues 527-674)

ELMO1 also has a pro-rich motif at the extreme C terminus. Secondary structure analysis has predicted that there are alpha-helical regions at both the N and C-terminus.

The structure of the pleckstrin homology domain of ELMO1 has been determine by X-ray crystallography.

Function 

The protein encoded by this gene interacts with the dedicator of cyto-kinesis 1 protein to promote phagocytosis and effect cell shape changes. Similarity to a C. elegans protein suggests that this protein may function in apoptosis and in cell migration. Alternative splicing of this gene results in multiple transcript variants encoding different isoforms.

Interactions 

ELMO1 has been shown to interact with Dock180 and HCK.  ELMO1 directly interacts with the SH3 domain of HCK.  The association between ELMO1 and HCK is dependent on polyproline interactions.

When ELMO1 is complexed with DOCK180, Rac GTPase-dependent biological processes are activated.  The pH domain of ELMO1 functions in trans to stabilize DOCK180 and make it resistant to degradation.  When ELMO1 binds to DOCK180 it relieves the steric inhibition of DOCK180 which then activates the Rac GTPase.  The pro-rich motif of the C terminus on ELMO1 is essential for the binding of ELMO1 to the SH3 domain at the N terminus of DOCK180.  The complex of ELMO1 and DOCK180 act as a regulator of Rac during development of a cell and cell migration.  Mutation of both interaction sites for DOCK180 on ELMO1 will lead to the disruption of the ELMO1-DOCK180 complex.  ELMO1 complexed with both DOCK180 and CrkII leads to maximal efficiency of phagocytosis in the cell. This complex of molecules happens upstream of Rac during phagocytosis.

References

Further reading